Part of the Banchō area,  is an upscale, mostly residential district of Chiyoda, Tokyo, Japan.  As of June 2020, the population of this district is 3,666 in 1,707 households. It borders the Tokyo Imperial Palace and the Chidorigafuchi moats to the east, Nibanchō and Yonbanchō to the west, Ichibanchō to the south, and Kudanminami to the north.

Like Yonbanchō, its official English spelling, Sanbanchō, does not follow the Hepburn romanization standard.

History

Similarly to the rest of the Banchō area,  was the site of residences of the Hatamoto soldiers in charge of guarding Edo Castle. Among those, the residence of Sano Masakoto (on present day site of Otsuma Women University), who became famous in 1784 by killing in the castle an unpopular government official.

As the Shogunate was nearing its end, Omura Masujiro opened in 1856 , a rangaku institute in his residence, located next to nowadays Chidorigafuchi National Cemetery.

Tōgō Heihachirō moved to Banchō in 1881 and lived there for 54 years.

The modern district was created on July 1st, 1933, through a merger of the former districts of Ichibancho, Kami-Rokubancho and parts of Fujimicho 1-chome.

Kyōka 
Sanbanchō was the subject of a famous Kyōka by Hanawa Hokiichi during Edo times.

Landmarks
Chidorigafuchi National Cemetery
Chidorigafuchi Green Way
Otsuma Women University
Otsuma Junior and Senior Highschool
Kudan Elementary School and Kindergarten
Apostolic Nunciature
Kudan campus of the Nishogakusha University
Tokyo Kasei-Gakuin University
Tokyo Kasei-Gakuin Junior and Senior Highschool
All-Japan Band Association
Togo Gensui Memorial Park

Education
 operates public elementary and junior high schools. Kudan Elementary School (九段小学校) is the zoned elementary school for Sanbanchō. There is a freedom of choice system for junior high schools in Chiyoda Ward, and so there are no specific junior high school zones.

References

Districts of Chiyoda, Tokyo